The Individual World Poetry Slam (iWPS) is a yearly poetry slam tournament put on by Poetry Slam, Inc. that pits individual slam poets from around the world against one another.

History 
From 1990 to 2007, the National Poetry Slam held an "individual" poetry competition (known as "indies") simultaneously with the team competition, with the poets earning the highest ranking individual poems during the first two days of competition moving on the semifinal and final rounds. The first ever winner of this event was Patricia Smith, who would go on to win the Individual National Poetry Slam Championship title a record four times.

Starting in 2004, Poetry Slam Inc (PSI) decided to host a separate event called the Individual World Poetry Slam (iWPS), in which solo poets (not teams of poets) competed for the championship title.  The first iWPS was held in Greenville, SC under the direction of Kimberly Simms and the first iWPS champion was Buddy Wakefield.

Because of the popularity of iWPS and to avoid the confusion of two "individual" poetry slam titles being awarded ever year, Poetry Slam Inc. decided to cancel the "indie" competition at the National Poetry Slam.

In 2016, the competition was held in Flagstaff, Arizona. When PSI dissolved, the name was taken by the Dallas Poetry Slam who continues to organize the event.

Format 
The tournament has two days of preliminary rounds, in which poets compete in 1, 2, 3, and 4 minute bouts. After these 4 bouts are completed, the poet's rankings in each bout are added up and the top 12 poets of the tournament are invited to compete in the final round. A 3 minute time limit is applied to the poems in the final round.

Tournament results by year

See also
List of performance poets
National Poetry Slam
Oral poetry
Performance poetry
Poetry Slam
Poetry Slam, Inc.
Spoken word
Women of the World Poetry Slam

References

External links 
 Official Poetry Slam Incorporated Homepage

Poetry festivals in the United States
Poetry slams